Pushpaka Vimana is a 2017, Indian Kannada drama film directed by S. Ravindranath, making his debut. The film stars Ramesh Aravind, acting in his 100th Kannada film, as the protagonist playing the father role. Rachita Ram and Baby Yuvina Parthavi play the daughters role. Prominent Bollywood actress Juhi Chawla is seen in a song sequence, marking her re-entry to Kannada films after 18 years. The film's title is borrowed from the 1987 silent film of the same name.

The film is a joint venture between Vikhyath Chitra Productions and Pawan Wadeyar Film Factory. The film's score and soundtrack is by Charan Raj whilst the cinematography is by Bhuvan Gowda. The film's teaser clocking 2minutes 37seconds and portraying the love and affection between the father and the daughter garnered much praise for Ramesh's expressive act and Bhuvan's cinematography.

The film was reported to be in contention for Best Adapted Screenplay at the Oscars, though it did not enter the long-list and short-list. The film is an unofficial remake of the 2013 South Korean movie Miracle in Cell No. 7  and lost the copyright infringement case against Kross Pictures.

Plot 
The story begins when a young lawyer opens a closed case. She tells that the man who was punished for a rape and murder in that case was innocent and had no fault of his. She reveals herself as the daughter of that man when the court asks for proof.
A intellectually-disabled man (Ramesh Arvind) is from a family of army employees and wants to continue the same. But his mental disability does not give a chance to fulfill it. He owns a rickshaw and runs it to feed himself and his daughter (Baby Yuvina). They have a lovely life.
They both are saving money to buy a toy plane liked by the daughter.
Eventually they are near the shop to buy it but have a small amount less so they thought of buying it the next day. But to their horror the daughter of a police chief desires the same plane and it was bought the very next moment leading the man to fight with the police. Next day while the man was driving his rickshaw he meets the same girl and she promises him to guide him to another shop where he can get a similar plane. But she is found to be dead and the man raping that girl was seen live by a woman and was reported to the police. He was arrested and his daughter left the house. She was then living in a charity school and had a connection to her father. Slowly the police in-charge of the jail and the man's cellmates understood he was just trying to first aid the child as he was taught in a public program. The all show mercy on him but the dead girl's father threatens him to accept that all fault was his or he would kill the man's daughter. So he accepted the crime in the court and was told to be hanged. He was hanged in an injustice manner. The jail in-charge who had lost his child adopted the man's daughter and made her a lawyer as per her wish.
The court considers that the man had no fault and was innocent.
She then thanks everyone and she was happy to prove her father was innocent.

Cast 

 Ramesh Aravind as Anantaramaiah
 Baby Yuvina Parthavi as young Puttalakshmi
 Rachita Ram as a grown-up Puttalakshmi
 Ravi Kale
 Mandeep Roy
 Rockline Sudhakar
 Manjunath
 K. S. Sridhar
 Juhi Chawla special appearance in song, "Jhilka Jhilka"

Production

Development 
Early reports of the film emerged in December 2015 that actor Ramesh Aravind would feature in a new film which has the title of the 1987 silent film Pushpaka Vimana. Initially apprehensive about using the same title, the team later decided to go ahead with the same as the story would connect to the title. Ramesh's role was revealed to be that of a father to a little girl and is "crazy about planes". The producers chose S. Ravindranath to helm the director role, making his debut in the feature film.

Casting 
After roping in Ramesh for the lead role, producers went in search for a baby girl who could play the daughter character to Ramesh. They finally selected Yuvina Parthavi after being impressed with her performance in the Tamil film Veeram (2015). Actress Rachita Ram was selected to play the role of grown-up daughter, the producers of the movie were claiming that even though the role of Rachita Ram is not full-fledged, it would be a prominent character which would last for about 10minutes. After launching the teaser, on 15 January 2016, the makers approached Bollywood actress Juhi Chawla to act in a few scenes including appearing in a special song in the film. This film would be Juhi's re-entry to Kannada cinema since her last release Shanti Kranti in 1991.

Teaser release 
On 15 January 2016, a teaser was released which saw the 2minutes 37seconds of video showing the emotional attachment between the father played by Ramesh and his daughter played by Yuvina. Upon the release of teaser, huge appreciations poured in from different quarters particularly pointing out Ramesh's acting along with Bhuvan's cinematography. The teaser was shown to Juhi Chawla before signing her into the film.

Music 

The music and background score for the film is composed by Charan Raj. The soundtrack album contains six songs.

Critical reception 
The Times of India rated the film 4 out of 5 and commented, "The film scores high technically. Bhuvan Gowda's fantastic visuals are complemented beautifully by Charan Raj's soulful background score. Their story is no edge-of-the-seat thriller but instead is a wonderful tale of love between a father and daughter, which unfolds in its own pace but keeps you hooked to the screen." Deccan Chronicle saw the film worthy of 3.5/5 and reviewed and called the film to be "flying high on emotion".

Writing to The Hindu, Archana Nathan was critical about the film and called it "A turbulent flight" further remarking that "it relies heavily on dialogue focussing more on telling rather than showing, at times even screaming the sentiment at its audience."

Copyright infringement 
Korea based Kross Pictures filed a copyright infringement case against the makers of the film citing proper remake rights have not been acquired from the production company which holds the rights of the film Miracle in Cell No. 7. However, the director, S. Ravindranath claimed that the film is not a "remake" but is taken inspiration from four films such as Life is Beautiful, I am Sam, Miracle in Cell No. 7 and The Pursuit of Happyness. However, the Bombay High Court issued an ad-interim injunction against the exhibition and distribution of the movie as prima facie it found the movie to be a copy of the Korean movie.

References

External links 
 

2017 films
2010s Kannada-language films
Indian remakes of South Korean films
Indian drama films
Films set in 1980
2010s prison drama films
Films about intellectual disability
2017 directorial debut films
2017 drama films